Cavite's 1st congressional district is one of the eight congressional districts of the Philippines in the province of Cavite. It has been represented in the House of Representatives of the Philippines since 1987. The district consists of the city of Cavite and its adjacent municipalities of Kawit, Noveleta, and Rosario. It is currently represented in the 19th Congress by Jolo Revilla of Lakas–CMD.

Representation history

Election results

2022

2019

2016

2013

2010

2007

See also 
 Legislative districts of Cavite

References 

Congressional districts of the Philippines
Politics of Cavite
1987 establishments in the Philippines
Congressional districts of Calabarzon
Constituencies established in 1987